Chiromantes eulimene is a species of crab found in the mangrove swamps of south-eastern Africa (South Africa and Mozambique).

Distribution
The range of C. eulimene extends from the Bashee to the Inhambane mangroves and includes the mangroves of KwaZulu-Natal where it occurs abundantly.

Description
Chiromantes eulimene has a light brown carapace with light orange-yellow chelae. They can be distinguished from the closely related Parasesarma catenatum by the absence of fur around the hinges of the chelae.

References

Grapsoidea
Crustaceans described in 1897
Taxa named by Johannes Govertus de Man